Manuel Gual Vidal (3 August 1903 – 7 August 1954) was a Mexican jurist and educator. In 1944 he served as rector of the National Autonomous University of Mexico and later secretary of public education.

Education and career
He completed his secondary school studies at the National Preparatory School in 1918 and entered the National Law School, where he was received as a lawyer in 1926.

From 1925 he served as an adjunct professor, teaching the subject of public international law. In 1939 he was elected director of the National Law School until 1941.

Conflict with the University
The day after the resignation of the rector, Brito Foucher, a group led by Gual, Roberto Medellin Ostos and Raul Cervantes Ahumada was presented to the rectory of the University. They were concerned about the University being considered leaderless and thus formed the group known as "Directorio" which sought to save the institution and take over the offices.

In order to achieve this purpose, they convened a meeting on August 3, 1944 in which they University Council appointed a Constituent that proceeded to elect the rector and informed of the knowledge of the problems of the University, would make the necessary reforms to the statute.

The council unanimously appointed Manuel Gual as rector, who set out to perform the actions deemed necessary to resolve the crisis of the university. However, just four days later, the President decided to ask both the Rector and Joseph Aguilar Alvarez, appointed by the University Council, to resign, as they had been appointed a compromise board (the Board of exrectors) which would assume the government of the institution and restore the university organization.

Although some resistance, but interested in resolving the conflict that put the university in crisis, this group of academics, like the one led by Aguilar, obeyed the president's decision and after the resignation of Gual Vidal, delivered to the members of the Board of exrectors the building of the rectory.

After his brief stewardship, he temporarily retired from teaching. He joined the cabinet of president, Miguel Alemán Valdés as secretary of public education, a post he held throughout the administration.

References

20th-century Mexican lawyers
1903 births
1954 deaths
Academic staff of the National Autonomous University of Mexico